"A language is a dialect with an army and navy" is a quip about the arbitrariness of the distinction between a dialect and a language. It points out the influence that social and political conditions can have over a community's perception of the status of a language or dialect. The facetious adage was popularized by the sociolinguist and Yiddish scholar Max Weinreich, who heard it from a member of the audience at one of his lectures in the 1940s.

Weinreich
This statement is usually attributed to Max Weinreich, a specialist in Yiddish linguistics, who expressed it in Yiddish:

The earliest known published source is Weinreich's article Der YIVO un di problemen fun undzer tsayt ( "The YIVO Faces the Post-War World"; literally "The YIVO and the problems of our time"), originally presented as a speech on 5 January 1945 at the annual YIVO conference. Weinreich did not give an English version.

In the article, Weinreich presents this statement as a remark of an auditor at a lecture series given between 13 December 1943 and 12 June 1944:

In his lecture, he discusses not just linguistic, but also broader, notions of "yidishkeyt" ( – lit. Jewishness).

The sociolinguist and Yiddish scholar Joshua Fishman suggested that he might have been the auditor at the Weinreich lecture. However, Fishman was assuming that the exchange took place at a conference in 1967, more than twenty years later than the YIVO lecture (1945) and in any case does not fit Weinreich's description above.

Other mentions

Some scholars believe that Antoine Meillet had earlier said that a language is a dialect with an army, but there is no contemporary documentation of this.

Jean Laponce noted in 2004 that the phrase had been attributed in "" (essentially anecdote) to Hubert Lyautey (1854–1934) at a meeting of the Académie Française; Laponce referred to the adage as "" ('Lyautey's law').

Randolph Quirk adapted the definition to "A language is a dialect with an army and a flag".

See also
 Abstand and ausbau languages
 Dialect continuum
 Language secessionism

References

Further reading
 
 
 
 Alexander Maxwell (2018). When Theory is a Joke: The Weinreich Witticism in Linguistics (pp 263–292). Beiträge zur Geschichte der Sprachwissenschaft. Vol 28, No 2.

Dialectology
Adages
Sociolinguistics
Yiddish words and phrases
Quotations from literature
1940s neologisms
Political quotes

de:Eine Sprache ist ein Dialekt mit einer Armee und einer Marine